Guarene is a comune (municipality) in the Province of Cuneo in the Italian region Piedmont, located in the area of Roero about  southeast of Turin and about  northeast of Cuneo.

It is part of the Roero historical region. Main sights include the castle (rebuilt in the 18th century), with Italian-style gardens, and the 17th century Palazzo Re Rebaudengo, now the seat of exhibitions.

Agriculture 
The hilly parts of the commune are planted with vines and fruit trees. The principle grape varieties are Arneis, Nebbiolo, Dolcetto and Barbera. A wide variety of fruit in grown, but of particular note is the local “Madernassa” pear, a variety which originated here in 1784 and is currently enjoying an expanding export market, being particularly popular in England. Towards the Tanaro, in Frazione Vaccheria the crops include tomatoes, peppers, garlic and cardoons.

References 

Cities and towns in Piedmont
Roero